Vasudev is an Indian name that may refer to
Given name
Vasudeva (Chahamana dynasty), 16th century Indian king
Vasudev Balwant Phadke (1845–1883), Indian freedom fighter 
Vasudev Devnani, Indian politician 
Vasudev Salgaocar (1916–1984), Indian businessman 
Vasudev V. Shenoy (1940–2015), Indian educationist and journalist 
Vasudev Vishnu Mirashi (1893–1985), Indian Sanskrit scholar 

Surname
Aditi Vasudev, 20th century Indian film actress 
Ganesh Vasudev Mavalankar (1888–1956), Indian independence activist
Jaggi Vasudev, Indian yogi 
Madhukar Vasudev Dhond (1914–2007), Indian literary and art critic
P. Kumar Vasudev, Indian television director
S. G. Vasudev (born 1941), Indian artist
Vishnu Vasudev Narlikar (1908–1991), Indian physicist